The Sins of St. Anthony is a 1920 American silent comedy film directed by James Cruze and written by Charles Collins and Elmer Blaney Harris. Starring Bryant Washburn, Margaret Loomis, Lorenza Lazzarini, Viora Daniel, Frank Jonasson, and May Baxter, it was released on July 4, 1920, by Paramount Pictures. It may be a lost film, as no known prints are known to exist.

Cast
Bryant Washburn as Anthony Osgood
Margaret Loomis as Jeanette Adair
Lorenza Lazzarini as Persis Meade
Viora Daniel as Valeria Vincent
Frank Jonasson as Lorenzo Pascal
May Baxter as Christine Fox
L.J. McCarthy as A. Fox
Lucien Littlefield as Lieutenant Humphrey Smith
Guy Oliver as Horatio Meade

References

External links 

 

1920 films
1920s English-language films
Silent American comedy films
1920 comedy films
Paramount Pictures films
Films directed by James Cruze
American black-and-white films
American silent feature films
1920s American films